Papyrus Berlin 17213 is Koine Greek fragment of the Septuagint dated to the 3rd century CE.

Description 
This is written in papyrus in codex form. P. Berlin 17213 contains fragments of Genesis 19, 11–13, 17–19. Contains a blank space for the name of God apparently, although Emanuel Tov thinks that it is a free space ending paragraph. This fragment is also referred to as number 995 on the list of the manuscripts of the Septuagint according to the classification of Alfred Rahlfs.

History 
This manuscript was published by K. Treu, Neue Berliner Septuagintafragmente (New fragment of the Septuaginta of Berlin), APF 20, 1970, pp. 46, 47. It is now stored in  Ägyptisches Museum in Berlin (P. 17213).

References

Bibliography

External links 
 P.Berlin 17213 recto
 P.Berlin 17213 verso

3rd-century biblical manuscripts
Septuagint manuscripts
Book of Genesis